The Chilean presidential primaries of 2013 were held in Chile on Sunday 30 June 2013. It was the first such election to be run by the government under a new primary law published in December 2012.

According to the law, primaries are voluntary, but its results are binding. The two main political coalitions decided to participate: Former president Michelle Bachelet won the Nueva Mayoría primary with 73% of the vote, while former senator and minister Pablo Longueira won the Alianza primary with 51%.

Longueira withdrew on 17 July and was replaced by Evelyn Matthei, who had not participated in the primaries. Bachelet defeated Matthei in the runoff election held on 15 December 2013.

Candidates

Alianza candidates

Both candidates were officially registered on 1 May 2013. Affiliates from both Alianza parties (RN and UDI) plus independent electors were allowed to vote.

Declined candidacy
Laurence Golborne (Ind.), held several ministerial posts during Sebastián Piñera's tenure. On 4 November 2012 he said he was willing to become the right's candidate for president. On 17 November 2012 he was proclaimed as the right's pre-candidate by the Independent Democratic Union. On 29 Abril 2013, Golborne declined his candidacy after the Supreme Court fined his former employer Cencosud for illegally raising credit card maintenance fees, which Golborne as chief executive officer of the company had approved. At the same time there were press reports of Golborne having offshore accounts in the British Virgin Islands, that he hadn't properly registered in his property statement.

Nueva Mayoría candidates

All four candidates were officially registered on 30 April 2013. Affiliates from all Nueva Mayoría parties plus independent electors were allowed to vote.

Primary results

Official and final results.

Source: Tricel via Servel.

Timeline

April 29, 2013: Golborne quits race, replaced by Longueira on same day.
May 1, 2013: Deadline to register in primaries.
May 31, 2013: Primary campaign advertising starts.
June 27, 2013: Primary campaign advertising ends.
June 30, 2013: Primaries held simultaneously nationwide.

See also
 2013 Chilean general election

References

External links

Provisional results (Servel)

2013 elections in Chile
Primary elections in Chile